The General John Hathorn Stone House is located on Hathorn Road in the town of Warwick, New York, United States, just off NY 94 a mile south of the village of Warwick. It was built by Hathorn in 1773 but expanded considerably in the mid-19th century.

It is on a 14-acre (5.6-ha) lot, the remainder of the original 300 acres (120 ha) Hathorn and his family farmed. In 2001 it and an early-19th-century outbuilding were listed on the National Register of Historic Places.

Building

The six-bay -story house is built of coursed rubblestone and uncoursed ashlar. The foundation is stone and the roof is asphalt shingle. A wooden porch spans the front, with its roof continuing the line of the main roof. Low dormer windows line the second story. Two frame wings come out from the rear and side, Large letters set into the brick on the west gable spell out "E., I & H, 1773", a reference to Hathorn and his wife and the year of the house's construction.

Much of the interior retains furnishings from the Victorian era, when the house was extensively redone. Behind the house is a mid-19th-century Greek Revival building that has been used for several purposes during the course of its existence.

History

As a young man Hathorn, a native of today's Delaware, had been on the surveying team that established the present land border between New York and New Jersey, which had been the subject of a lengthy conflict between the two colonies for much of the 18th century. He settled in Warwick and opened a store and iron forge in 1770, and built the house after marrying Elizabeth Welling, daughter of his local host, in 1772. The inscription of their initials and the year of construction in the side of the house is a tradition more commonly associated with Germanic building traditions, a sign of how influential settlers of that background were in the Hudson Valley.

During the Revolutionary War he rose from the rank of captain to colonel, and was promoted to major general afterwards. According to local lore, George Washington spent the night at Hathorn's house on two occasions. Hathorn commanded the local militia, entrusted with guarding the Ramapo approach to the Hudson Valley. He was one of the few survivors of their defeat by Joseph Brant at the Battle of Minisink Ford. The front of the house holds a niche where he hid for a week from an attempt on his life by local Loyalists and their Indian allies.

After the war he began a more successful political career, first in the New York State Assembly, where he rose to become speaker, then in the state senate and finally in the House of Representatives in the early 19th century. Upon his death in 1825 his family kept the house for nine more years, then sold it to the Sanford family, who combined it with the lot holding the neighboring Jeremiah Morehouse House. They added the rear building, the wings and the porch in addition to doubling the house's original size. In 1923 they sold it to another family, and it has passed through several owners since then. In that year, and again in 2000, Hathorn's descendants held a reunion at the house.

Today the road, a former section of Route 94, is named for Hathorn. A nearby restaurant is also known as Chateau Hathorn.

As of March, 2009, a Permaculture practice and education initiative has been implemented on the site.

The Hathorn Stone House will be home to Hathorn Farm's education initiative featuring Permaculture and a 72-hour Permaculture Design Certification course. Most of the practical implementations of Permaculture were unknowingly implemented in the days of the founding fathers, as many of the capitalistic absurdities of today were not yet in existence.  The current owners of the farm look to return the land and farm, not only to embrace the days of Revolution against the bloody Red Coats for taxation without representation that we experience in 2009, but to educate Warwickians about the age-old teachings of homesteading that are comprehensively taught with the curriculum of Permaculture Design Certification.

With running water now available after an ongoing court feud with the Village of Warwick, where the court ordered a temporary restraining order against the Village, a feud dating back over 100 years, the owners of the homestead directing the Permaculture course can graciously greet their guests for their unprecedented educational Permaculture course set for commencement on October 10, 2009.

References

Houses on the National Register of Historic Places in New York (state)
Houses in Orange County, New York
National Register of Historic Places in Orange County, New York
Houses completed in 1773
Warwick, New York